The Tengzigou Dam is an arch dam on the Dragon River, a tributary of the Yangtze River, in Shizhu County, Chongqing, China. Construction on the dam began in 2006, the first generator was operational in 2005 and the project was complete in 2006. The dam supports a 70 MW hydroelectric power station.

See also

List of dams and reservoirs in China

References

Dams in China
Hydroelectric power stations in Chongqing
Arch dams
Dams completed in 2006